JAC or Jac may refer to:

Businesses
JAC Liner, a Philippine bus company
JAC Motors, a Chinese automobile manufacturer
Japan Air Commuter airline (ICAO: JAC)

Organizations
JAC (football club), a football club from Libreville, Gabon
Japanese Alpine Club
Jewish Anti-Fascist Committee, a Soviet political organization
Jharkhand Academic Council
Joint Analysis Center, US intelligence agency
Joint Astronomy Centre, an observatory telescope operator
Judicial Appointments Commission, of England and Wales
Junta de Aviación Civil, the civil aviation authority of the Dominican Republic
Men's Hockey Junior Africa Cup, international under-21 field hockey tournament organised by the African Hockey Federation.

Other uses
J.A.C., an album from Austrian band Tosca
Jac Naylor, a fictional character in Holby City
Castra of Jac, a fort in the Roman province of Dacia
Jakaltek language (ISO 639-3: jac)
John Abbott College, Sainte-Anne-de-Bellevue, Quebec, Canada
Journal of Ancient Civilizations, a journal for the history, archaeology and philology of ancient cultures
Jackson Hole Airport, Wyoming, U.S. (IATA:JAC)
A village in Creaca commune, Sălaj County, Romania
The Jac, a nickname for the Liverpool music venue The Jacaranda, U.K.

People
Jac Arama, British poker player
John Jones (Jac Glan-y-gors), Welsh poet John Jones
Jac Holzman, American music executive
Jac Jagaciak, Polish model
Jac Morgan, Welsh rugby union player
Jacques Nasser, Australian businessman known as "Jac The Knife"
Jac Nellemann, Danish motorsport racer
Jac Rayner, British author
Jac Schaeffer, American screenwriter and director
Jac. P. Thijsse, Dutch botanist
Jacobus van Looy, Dutch painter known as Jac
Jac van Steen, Dutch music conductor
Jac Venza, American TV producer
F. P. Jac, Danish poet

See also
Telangana Joint Action Committee (TJAC)
Jack (disambiguation)
JACS (disambiguation)
JAX (disambiguation)